Express Freighters Australia is a cargo airline based in Sydney, Australia. It was established in August 2006 and is wholly owned by Qantas Freight, a subsidiary of Qantas.

History
 
It commenced operations on 24 October 2006, initially operating one Boeing 737-300, and expanded to four aircraft during 2007.

The four 737s supplanted Boeing 727-200s previously operated on behalf of Australian airExpress (itself a joint venture between Qantas Freight and Australia Post) by National Jet Systems.

Fleet 

The Express Freighters Australia fleet consists of the following aircraft (as of August 2021):

 4 Boeing 737-300F
 1 Boeing 767-300ERF
 1 Boeing 737-400F
 3 Airbus A321P2F

The four 737-300 aircraft were formerly part of the Qantas passenger-carrying fleet and are still owned by Qantas. Express Freighters Australia also operates a Boeing 767-300F on behalf of its parent company Qantas Freight. All Three Airbus A321P2Fs have been delivered to Express Freight Australia and are in service flying around Australia to major airports like Sydney, Melbourne, Brisbane and Perth airports.

See also
List of airlines of Australia

References

External links

Airlines established in 2006
Australian companies established in 2006
Cargo airlines of Australia
Qantas
Companies based in Sydney